†Partula umbilicata was a species of air-breathing tropical land snail, a terrestrial pulmonate gastropod mollusk in the family Partulidae. This species was endemic to Tahaa, French Polynesia. It is now extinct.

References

U
Extinct gastropods
Extinct animals of Oceania
Fauna of French Polynesia
Molluscs of Oceania
Molluscs of the Pacific Ocean
Gastropods described in 1866
Taxa named by William Harper Pease
Taxonomy articles created by Polbot